The 2014–15 Washington Wizards season was the 54th season of the franchise in the National Basketball Association (NBA) and 42nd in the Washington, D.C. area. The Wizards recorded their best regular season record since 1978–79 and secured a place in the NBA playoffs, but despite sweeping the Toronto Raptors in their first round playoff series, they were eliminated in a 2–4 loss in the Eastern Conference Semifinals by the top-seeded Atlanta Hawks.

Preseason

Draft picks

Regular season

Standings

Game log

Preseason

Regular season

|- style="background:#fcc;"
| 1
| October 29
| @ Miami
| 
| Drew GoodenMarcin Gortat (18)
| Marcin GortatGarrett Temple (7)
| John Wall (11)
| AmericanAirlines Arena19,744
| 0–1
|- style="background:#cfc;"
| 2
| October 30
| @ Orlando
| 
| John Wall (30)
| Marcin Gortat (12)
| John Wall (12)
| Amway Center18,846
| 1–1

|- style="background:#cfc;"
| 3
| November 1
| Milwaukee
| 
| Nenê (22)
| Marcin Gortat (9)
| John Wall (10)
| Verizon Center17,992
| 2–1
|- style="background:#cfc;"
| 4
| November 4
| @ New York
| 
| Pierce & Temple (17)
| Nenê, Gortat & Porter (7)
| John Wall (7)
| Madison Square Garden19,812
| 3–1
|- style="background:#cfc;"
| 5
| November 5
| Indiana
| 
| John Wall (31)
| Marcin Gortat (10)
| John Wall (10)
| Verizon Center15,268
| 4–1
|- style="background:#fcc;"
| 6
| November 7
| @ Toronto
| 
| Otto Porter (13)
| Marcin Gortat (10)
| John Wall (7)
| Air Canada Centre19,800
| 4–2
|- style="background:#cfc;"
| 7
| November 8
| @ Indiana
| 
| John Wall (18)
| Kris Humphries (9)
| Nenê (5)
| Bankers Life Fieldhouse17,302
| 5–2
|- style="background:#cfc;"
| 8
| November 12
| Detroit
| 
| John Wall (27)
| Marcin Gortat (13)
| John Wall (11)
| Verizon Center14,708
| 6–2
|- style="background:#cfc;"
| 9
| November 15
| Orlando
| 
| Nenê & Humphries (16)
| Marcin Gortat (7)
| John Wall (10)
| Verizon Center19,110
| 7–2
|- style="background:#fcc;"
| 10
| November 19
| Dallas
| 
| Bradley Beal (21)
| Gortat, Wall & Humphries (6)
| John Wall (11)
| Verizon Center16,374
| 7–3
|- style="background:#cfc;"
| 11
| November 21
| Cleveland
| 
| John Wall (28)
| Nenê (7)
| John Wall (7)
| Verizon Center20,356
| 8–3
|- style="background:#cfc;"
| 12
| November 22
| @ Milwaukee
| 
| Paul Pierce (25)
| Marcin Gortat (13)
| John Wall (9)
| BMO Harris Bradley Center14,254
| 9–3
|- style="background:#fcc;"
| 13
| November 25
| Atlanta
| 
| John Wall (21)
| Marcin Gortat (11)
| John Wall (13)
| Verizon Center15,440
| 9–4
|- style="background:#fcc;"
| 14
| November 26
| @ Cleveland
| 
| Rasual Butler (23)
| John Wall (4)
| John Wall (7)
| Quicken Loans Arena20,562
| 9–5
|- style="background:#cfc;"
| 15
| November 29
| New Orleans
| 
| Marcin Gortat (24)
| Marcin Gortat (13)
| John Wall (7)
| Verizon Center17,581
| 10–5

|- style="background:#cfc;"
| 16
| December 1
| Miami
| 
| Rasual Butler (23)
| Marcin Gortat (10)
| John Wall (13)
| Verizon Center15,150
| 11–5
|- style="background:#cfc;"
| 17
| December 3
| L.A. Lakers
| 
| Bradley Beal (21)
| Kris Humphries (20)
| John Wall (15)
| Verizon Center18,490
| 12–5
|- style="background:#cfc;"
| 18
| December 5
| Denver
| 
| Kris Humphries (20)
| Wall & Nenê (8)
| John Wall (12)
| Verizon Center19,451
| 13–5
|- style="background:#fcc;"
| 19
| December 7
| @ Boston
| 
| Rasual Butler (22)
| Kris Humphries (14)
| John Wall (14)
| TD Garden16,716
| 13–6
|- style="background:#cfc;"
| 20
| December 8
| Boston
| 
| Paul Pierce (28)
| Marcin Gortat (12)
| John Wall (17)
| Verizon Center14,828
| 14–6
|- style="background:#cfc;"
| 21
| December 10
| @ Orlando
| 
| John Wall (21)
| Pierce, Wall & Nenê (6)
| John Wall (11)
| Amway Center16,081
| 15–6
|- style="background:#cfc;"
| 22
| December 12
| L.A. Clippers
| 
| Bradley Beal (29)
| Kris Humphries (8)
| John Wall (11)
| Verizon Center17,437
| 16–6
|- style="background:#cfc;"
| 23
| December 14
| Utah
| 
| Bradley Beal (22)
| Gortat & Beal (7)
| John Wall (8)
| Verizon Center15,220
| 17–6
|- style="background:#cfc;"
| 24
| December 16
| Minnesota
| 
| Rasual Butler (23)
| Kris Humphries (10)
| John Wall (17)
| Verizon Center15,823
| 18–6
|- style="background:#cfc;"
| 25
| December 19
| @ Miami
| 
| Wall & Nenê (20)
| Gortat & Beal (7)
| John Wall (10)
| American Airlines Arena19,600
| 19–6
|- style="background:#fcc;"
| 26
| December 21
| Phoenix
| 
| Rasual Butler (17)
| Gortat & Beal (7)
| John Wall (8)
| Verizon Center18,207
| 19–7
|- style="background:#fcc;"
| 27
| December 23
| Chicago
| 
| John Wall (18)
| Gortat (11)
| John Wall (9)
| Verizon Center20,356
| 19–8
|- style="background:#cfc;"
| 28
| December 25
| @ New York
| 
| John Wall (24)
| Gortat (9)
| John Wall (11)
| Madison Square Garden19,812
| 20–8
|- style="background:#cfc;"
| 29
| December 27
| Boston
| 
| Paul Pierce (17)
| Gortat (10)
| Wall & Miller (7)
| Verizon Center20,356
| 21–8
|- style="background:#cfc;"
| 30
| December 29
| @ Houston
| 
| Bradley Beal (33)
| Marcin Gortat (7)
| John Wall (12)
| Toyota Center18,322
| 22–8
|- style="background:#fcc;"
| 31
| December 30
| @ Dallas
| 
| John Wall (11)
| Kris Humphries (7)
| John Wall (8)
| American Airlines Center20,397
| 22–9

|- style="background:#fcc;"
| 32
| January 2
| @ Oklahoma City
| 
| Bradley Beal (21)
| Bradley Beal (10)
| John Wall (12)
| Chesapeake Energy Arena18,203
| 22–10
|- style="background:#fcc;"
| 33
| January 3
| @ San Antonio
| 
| Beal & Wall (15)
| Kris Humphries (8)
| John Wall (8)
| AT&T Center18,581
| 22–11
|- style="background:#cfc;"
| 34
| January 5
| @ New Orleans
| 
| John Wall (15)
| Nenê & Porter (7)
| John Wall (12)
| Smoothie King Center16,182
| 23–11
|- style="background:#cfc;"
| 35
| January 7
| New York
| 
| Nenê  (20)
| Marcin Gortat (11)
| John Wall (8)
| Verizon Center16,902
| 24–11
|- style="background:#cfc;"
| 36
| January 9
| Chicago
| 
| Marcin Gortat (21)
| Marcin Gortat (13)
| John Wall (12)
| Verizon Center20,356
| 25–11
|- style="background:#fcc;"
| 37
| January 11
| @ Atlanta
| 
| John Wall (15)
| Nenê & Seraphin (6)
| John Wall (8)
| Philips Arena18,057
| 25–12
|- style="background:#cfc;"
| 38
| January 13
| San Antonio
| 
| John Wall (25)
| Marcin Gortat (11)
| John Wall (8)
| Verizon Center18,116
| 26–12
|- style="background:#cfc;"
| 39
| January 14
| @ Chicago
| 
| Paul Pierce (22)
| Gortat & Humphries (9)
| John Wall (9)
| United Center21,498
| 27–12
|- style="background:#fcc;"
| 40
| January 16
| Brooklyn
| 
| John Wall (13)
| Kris Humphries (8)
| John Wall (6)
| Verizon Center17,788
| 27–13
|- style="background:#cfc;"
| 41
| January 17
| @ Brooklyn
| 
| Nenê (20)
| Marcin Gortat (16)
| Bradley Beal (8)
| Barclays Center17,732
| 28–13
|- style="background:#cfc;"
| 42
| January 19
| Philadelphia
| 
| Marcin Gortat (20)
| Humphries & Seraphin (9)
| John Wall (10)
| Verizon Center19,040
| 29–13
|- style="background:#fcc;"
| 43
| January 21
| Oklahoma City
| 
| Nenê (24)
| Paul Pierce (12)
| John Wall (13)
| Verizon Center20,356
| 29–14
|- style="background:#fcc;"
| 44
| January 24
| @ Portland
| 
| John Wall (25)
| Marcin Gortat (7)
| John Wall (9)
| Moda Center19,775
| 29–15
|- style="background:#cfc;"
| 45
| January 25
| @ Denver
| 
| Kris Humphries (21)
| Kris Humphries (14)
| John Wall (16)
| Pepsi Center15,410
| 30–15
|- style="background:#cfc;"
| 46
| January 27
| @ L.A. Lakers
| 
| John Wall (21)
| Kris Humphries (11)
| John Wall (13)
| Staples Center18,997
| 31–15
|- style="background:#fcc;"
| 47
| January 28
| @ Phoenix
| 
| Gortat & Porter (14)
| Kris Humphries (15)
| John Wall (7)
| US Airways Center16,209
| 31–16
|- style="background:#fcc;"
| 48
| January 31
| Toronto
| 
| John Wall (28)
| Kris Humphries (14)
| John Wall (12)
| Verizon Center20,356
| 31–17

|- style="background:#fcc;"
| 49
| February 2
| Charlotte
| 
| Bradley Beal (18)
| Bradley Beal (11)
| John Wall (10)
| Verizon Center15,816
| 31–18
|-style="background:#fcc;"
|50
| February 4
| @ Atlanta
| 
| John Wall (24)
| Marcin Gortat (9)
| John Wall (9)
|Philips Arena18,047
| 31–19
|- style="background:#fcc;"
| 51
| February 5
| @ Charlotte
| 
| Paul Pierce (19)
| Marcin Gortat (7)
| John Wall (13)
|Time Warner Cable Arena17,019
| 31–20
|- style="background:#cfc;"
| 52
| February 7
| Brooklyn
| 
| John Wall (17)
| Kris Humphries (11)
| John Wall (7)
| Verizon Center15,816
| 32–20
|- style="background:#cfc;"
| 53
| February 9
| Orlando
| 
| Rasual Butler (15)
| Marcin Gortat (14)
| John Wall (10)
| Verizon Center16,031
| 33–20
|- style="background:#fcc;"
| 54
| February 11
| @ Toronto
| 
| John Wall (21)
| Drew Gooden (12)
| John Wall (8)
| Air Canada Centre19,800
| 33–21
|- align="center"
|colspan="9" bgcolor="#bbcaff"|All-Star Break
|- style="background:#fcc;"
| 55
| February 20
| Cleveland
| 
| Wall & Nenê (18)
| Gortat & Humphries (6)
| John Wall (9)
| Verizon Center20,356
| 33–22
|- style="background:#fcc;"
| 56
| February 22
| @ Detroit
| 
| Gortat (24)
| Gortat (10)
| John Wall (12)
| The Palace of Auburn Hills18,371
| 33–23
|- style="background:#fcc;"
| 57
| February 24
| Golden State
| 
| Paul Pierce (25)
| Marcin Gortat (11)
| John Wall (11)
| Verizon Center20,356
| 33–24
|- style="background:#fcc;"
| 58
| February 25
| Minnesota
| 
| Otto Porter Jr. (13)
| Marcin Gortat (15)
| John Wall (10)
| Target Center19,856
| 33–25
|- style="background:#fcc;"
| 59
| February 27
| @ Philadelphia
| 
| John Wall (21)
| Marcin Gortat (14)
| John Wall (11)
| Wells Fargo Center18,089
| 33–26
|- style="background:#cfc;"
| 60
| February 28
| Detroit
| 
| John Wall (22)
| Marcin Gortat (17)
| John Wall (6)
| Verizon Center20,356
| 34–26

|- style="background:#fcc;"
| 61
| March 3
| @ Chicago
| 
| John Wall (21)
| Marcin Gortat (12)
| John Wall (11) 
| United Center21,468
| 34–27
|- style="background:#cfc;"
| 62
| March 6
| Miami
| 
| Nenê (20)
| Marcin Gortat (17)
| John Wall (12)  
| Verizon Center20,356
| 35–27
|- style="background:#fcc;"
| 63
| March 7
| @ Milwaukee
| 
| Paul Pierce (14)
| Drew Gooden (10)
| John Wall (6)
| BMO Harris Bradley Center16,216
| 35–28
|- style="background:#cfc;"
| 64
| March 9
| @ Charlotte
| 
| Marcin Gortat (20)
| Kevin Seraphin & Marcin Gortat (7)
| John Wall (9)
| Time Warner Cable Arena15,119
| 36–28
|- style="background:#cfc;"
| 65
| March 12
| Memphis
| 
| Marcin Gortat (22)
| Marcin Gortat (9)
| John Wall & Sessions (6)
| Verizon Center18,186
| 37–28
|- style="background:#cfc;"
| 66
| March 14
| Sacramento
| 
| John Wall (31)
| Drew Gooden (9)
| John Wall (12)
| Verizon Center20,356
| 38–28
|- style="background:#cfc;"
| 67
| March 16
| Portland
| 
| John Wall (21)
| Gortat & Wall (9)
| John Wall (11)
| Verizon Center17,324
| 39–28
|- style="background:#cfc;"
| 68
| March 18
| @ Utah
| 
| John Wall (24)
| Gortat & Wall (9)
| John Wall (6)
| Energy Solutions Arena19,498
| 40–28
|- style="background:#fcc;"
| 69
| March 20
| @ L.A. Clippers
| 
| John Wall (19)
| Nene Hilario (7)
| John Wall (10)
| Staples Center19,218
| 40–29
|- style="background:#fcc;"
| 70
| March 22
| @ Sacramento
| 
| Bradley Beal (19)
| Marcin Gortat (7)
| John Wall (8)
| Sleep Train Arena17,008
| 40–30
|- style="background:#fcc;"
| 71
| March 23
| @ Golden State
| 
| Beal & Seraphin & Sessions (12)
| Kevin Seraphin (8)
| John Wall (5)
| Oracle Arena19,596
| 40–31
|- style="background:#fcc;"
| 72
| March 25
| Indiana
| 
| John Wall (34)
| Kevin Seraphin & Marcin Gortat (7)
| John Wall (6)
| Verizon Center18,514
| 40–32
|- style="background:#cfc;"
| 73
| March 27
| Charlotte
| 
| John Wall (32)
| Drew Gooden (17)
| Beal & Wall (6)
| Verizon Center18,441
| 41–32
|- style="background:#fcc;"
| 74
| March 29
| Houston
| 
| John Wall (25)
| Marcin Gortat (10)
| John Wall (12)
| Verizon Center20,356
| 41–33

|- style="background:#cfc;"
| 75
| April 1
| Philadelphia
| 
| Marcin Gortat (23)
| Marcin Gortat (14)
| John Wall (15)
| Verizon Center17,501
| 42–33
|- style="background:#cfc;"
| 76
| April 3
| New York
| 
| Marcin Gortat (19)
| Drew Gooden (13)
| John Wall (18)
| Verizon Center19,389
| 43–33
|- style="background:#cfc;"
| 77
| April 4
| @ Memphis
| 
| Bradley Beal (20)
| Marcin Gortat (8)
| John Wall (14)
| FedExForum18,119
| 44–33
|- style="background:#cfc;"
| 78
| April 8
| @ Philadelphia
| 
| Bradley Beal (21)
| Gortat & Humphries (7)
| Sessions & Bynum (7)
| Wells Fargo Center12,611
| 45–33
|- style="background:#fcc;"
| 79
| April 10
| @ Brooklyn
| 
| Bradley Beal (24)
| Marcin Gortat (16)
| John Wall (10)
| Barclays Center17,732
| 45–34
|- style="background:#cfc;"
| 80
| April 12
| Atlanta
| 
| John Wall (24)
| Nene Hilario (10)
| John Wall (9)
| Verizon Center19,041
| 46–34
|- style="background:#fcc;"
| 81
| April 14
| @ Indiana
| 
| Beal & Gortat (19)
| Gooden & Gortat (10)
| John Wall (11)
| Bankers Life Fieldhouse18,165
| 46–35
|- style="background:#fcc;"
| 82
| April 15
| @ Cleveland
| 
| Martell Webster (20)
| Kevin Seraphin (12)
| Will Bynum (8)
| Quicken Loans Arena20,562
| 46–36

Playoffs

Game log

|- style="background:#bfb;"
| 1
| April 18
| @ Toronto
| 
| Paul Pierce (20)
| Nenê (13)
| John Wall (8)
| Air Canada Centre 19,800
| 1–0
|- style="background:#bfb;"
| 2
| April 21
| @ Toronto
| 
| Bradley Beal (28)
| Nenê & Porter (9)
| John Wall (17)
| Air Canada Centre19,800
| 2–0
|- style="background:#bfb;"
| 3
| April 24
| Toronto
| 
| Marcin Gortat (24)
| Marcin Gortat (13)
| John Wall (15)
| Verizon Center20,356
| 3–0
|- style="background:#bfb;"
| 4
| April 26
| Toronto
| 
| Bradley Beal (23)
| Marcin Gortat (11)
| John Wall (10)
| Verizon Center20,356
| 4–0

|- style="background:#bfb;"
| 1
| May 3
| @ Atlanta
| 
| Bradley Beal (28)
| Marcin Gortat (12)
| John Wall (13)
| Philips Arena18,148
| 1–0
|- style="background:#fbb;"
| 2
| May 5
| @ Atlanta
| 
| Ramon Sessions (21)
| Marcin Gortat (9)
| Bradley Beal (7)
| Philips Arena18,131
| 1–1
|- style="background:#bfb;"
| 3
| May 9
| Atlanta
| 
| Beal, Nene, Porter Jr. (17)
| Otto Porter Jr. (9)
| Bradley Beal (8)
| Verizon Center20,356
| 2–1
|- style="background:#fbb;"
| 4
| May 11
| Atlanta
| 
| Bradley Beal (34)
| Marcin Gortat (8)
| Bradley Beal (7)
| Verizon Center20,356
| 2–2
|- style="background:#fbb;"
| 5
| May 13
| @ Atlanta
| 
| Bradley Beal (23)
| Otto Porter Jr. (10)
| John Wall (7)
| Philips Arena18,854
| 2–3
|- style="background:#fbb;"
| 6
| May 15
| Atlanta
| 
| Bradley Beal (29)
| Nene Hilario (11)
| John Wall (13)
| Verizon Center20,356
| 2–4

Post-season

Player statistics

Summer League

|-
|}

Preseason

|-
|}

Regular season

|-
|}

Injuries

Roster

Transactions

Trades

Free agents

Re-signed

Additions

Subtractions

Awards

References

External links

 2014–15 Washington Wizards preseason at ESPN
 2014–15 Washington Wizards regular season at ESPN

Washington Wizards seasons
Washington Wizards
Wash
Wash